A gurn or chuck is a distorted facial expression and a verb to describe the action. A typical gurn involves projecting the lower jaw as far forward and up as possible and covering the upper lip with the lower lip.

The English Dialect Dictionary, compiled by Joseph Wright, defines the word gurn as "to snarl as a dog; to look savage; to distort the countenance," while the Oxford English Dictionary suggests the derivation may originally be Scottish, related to "grin." In Northern Ireland, the verb "to gurn" means "to cry," and crying is often referred to as "gurnin'." Originally the Scottish dialectical usage refers to a person who is complaining. The term "gurn" may also refer to an involuntary facial muscular contortion experienced as a side-effect of MDMA consumption.

Gurning contests 
Gurning contests are a rural English tradition. They are held regularly in some villages, with contestants traditionally framing their faces through a horse collar — known as "gurnin' through a braffin".

The World Gurning Championship takes place annually at the Egremont Crab Fair. The fair dates back to 1267, when King Henry III granted it a Royal Charter. The origins of the gurning competition itself are unclear, and it may not be so old, although it was described as an ancient tradition by local newspaper The Cumberland Paquet in 1852.

Those with the greatest gurn capabilities are often those with no teeth, as this provides greater room to move the jaw further up. In some cases, the elderly or otherwise toothless can be capable of gurns covering the entire nose.

Peter Jackman became England's best-known gurner, winning the world championship four times, beginning in 1998 with a face called the "Bela Lugosi". He made numerous TV appearances, including an appearance on They Think It's All Over. He had his teeth removed in 2000 to make his features easier to manoeuvre.

The only male gurner to win the world title 15 times is Tommy Mattinson (UK), who took the top prize at the World Gurning Championship in 1986–87 and then 10 times between 1999 and 2010.

Anne Woods won the women's world title 28 times.

References

External links

BBC: In Pictures – World Gurning Championship
First Worldwide Annual ABSFG Gurning Contest
Second (Almost Annual) Worldwide Gurning Contest
 Guinness World Records

Culture in Cumbria
Facial expressions